Jhusia Damai ( झूसिया दमाई ) (1910–2005) was the great folk singer of Kumauni culture. He was born as a son of Ranuwa Dami in Baskot of Baitadi District of Nepal very close to Jhulaghat of Pithoragarh District of Uttrakhand and lived in Dhungatoil near Dharchula.

References

http://apnauttarakhand.com/jhunsia-damai/

1910 births
2005 deaths
People from Pithoragarh district
Indian male folk singers
20th-century Indian male singers
20th-century Indian singers
Nepalese emigrants to India